Kaernefeltia is a genus of lichenized fungi in the family Parmeliaceae.

Taxonomy
Kaernefeltia was circumscribed by lichenologists Arne Thell and Trevor Goward in 1996 to contain the western North American species formerly known as Cetraria californica (the type species) and C. merrillii. The genus name honours Swedish lichenologist Ingvar Kärnefelt.

In 2017, Divakar and colleagues used a recently developed "temporal phylogenetic" approach to identify temporal bands for specific taxonomic ranks in the family Parmeliaceae, suggesting that groups of species that diverged within the time window of 29.45–32.55 million years ago represent genera. They proposed to synonymize Kaernefeltia with Nephromopsis, along with several other Parmelioid genera, so that all the genera within the Parmeliaceae are about the same age. Although some of their proposed taxonomic changes were accepted, the synonymization of the Parmelioid genera with Nephromopsis was not accepted in a recent analysis.

Species
Kaernefeltia californica 
Kaernefeltia iberica 
Kaernefeltia merrillii 

Kaernefeltia iberica was published invalidly, as it lacked a citation of an identifier from a registration depository.

References

Parmeliaceae
Lichen genera
Lecanorales genera
Taxa described in 1996